Upali Kodituwakku (born 10 July 1964) is a Sri Lankan former first-class cricketer who played for Kandy Youth Cricket Club.

References

External links
 

1964 births
Living people
Sri Lankan cricketers
Kandy Youth Cricket Club cricketers
Sportspeople from Kandy